The Ellendale Diamond Field is a cluster of lamproite intrusions located 125 km ESE of Derby within the WNW trending Lennard Shelf to the south of the Kimberley Block in the West Kimberly region of Australia. The Ellendale diamond field was once the source of up to 50% of the worlds supply of Fancy Yellow diamonds. Ellendale's volcanic pipes intruded during the Miocene age between 22 and 19 Ma and nearly 48 lamproites have been mapped within the NW trending 1500 square kilometre (60 x 25 km) field.  More than 100 lamproite intrusions are known over a wider 7500 km2 area surrounding the Ellendale swarm. Some 45 of the Ellendale intrusives are volcanic crater deposits, while 3 are classed as volcanic sills. The lamproites are either leucite or olivine rich, with 60% being diamondiferous. The first Ellendale pipe was identified in 1976 with diamonds mostly mined from 2 open pit hard rock mines at the Ellendale 4 (E4) and Ellendale 9 (E9) lamprorite pipes.  Although of low grade (5 to 14 carats per hundred ton), the Ellendale mines were characterised by a high proportion (75-90%) gem-quality stones, including colourless, Fancy yellow, green and brown diamonds.

Ellendale Fancy Yellow diamonds 

High value Fancy yellow diamonds are a signature of the Ellendale Diamond field and between 2009 and 2015 Tiffany & Co had exclusive rights to purchase 100% of the Fancy yellow diamonds produced at Ellendale. Ellendale Fancy yellow diamonds are typically highly lustrous, shiny surfaced, rounded tetrahexahedroid or dodecahedra. Many of the Ellendale diamonds have undergone a process called resorption where the diamond crystals have been partially dissolved in hot magma/plasma during their journey to the surface of the earth. Often more than 50% of the original weight of the diamond has been lost to this process.

History of the Ellendale Field 
A group of companies known as the Ashton Joint Venture first discovered the Ellendale Diamond Field in November 1976. Some 48 lamprorite pipes were subsequently identified and mining feasibility studies conducted over the next few years. In August 1979 a sample taken 420 km away at Smoke Creek by the joint venture's geologist Maureen Muggeridge produced two diamonds and their focus very quickly shifted away from Ellendale to this new prospect, which was to eventually develop into the Argyle diamond mine. The development of the Ellendale deposits was left in limbo.

More than two decades later, geologists from the Kimberley Diamond Company (KDC) recognised eluvial diamond enrichment over the Ellendale pipes and after a lengthy legal battle, they wrested the Ellendale mining lease away from the Ashton Joint Venture.

Ellendale 9 (E9) 
Despite diamonds first being discovered at the Ellendale 4 pipe, hard rock mining actually first began at Ellendale 15 km to the north west at the Ellendale 9 (E9) pipe in May 2002 and continued under various owners until mid 2015.

Ellendale 4 (E4) 
Mining began at the E4 pipe in 2005 but by 2009 the E4 mine was put on care and maintenance as the high Australian dollar combined with dwindling reserves began to make the E4 pipe uneconomic.

Abandonment of the E9 and E4 mines 

In July 2015, mining activities ceased abruptly at the E9 and E4 hard rock mines when then owner Kimberley Diamond Company (KDC) entered into administration, and subsequently into liquidation.  The site was declared an abandoned mine site in accordance with the Western Australia, Mining Rehabilitation Fund Act 2012 (MRF Act) in December 2015.

Scientific Significance of Ellendale 
Until the discovery of diamonds within the Ellendale lamproites it was believed that Kimberlite was the only economic source of diamonds in the world. The Ellendale discovery that lamprorite could also produce diamonds led to intense worldwide diamond exploration and the subsequent discovery of the Argyle lamprorite diamond mine, famous for its Fancy Pink diamonds, in the adjacent East Kimberley region of Australia about 420 km to the north east of Ellendale.

Ellendale eventually became the largest Fancy Yellow diamond mine in the world with up to 12% of its diamond production being the highly valued Fancy yellow stones.

Developments since 2017 

As of 2021, two companies currently operate full mining leases within the Ellendale field. A privately owned company, India Bore Diamond Holdings Pty Ltd (IBDH) operates a large mining lease granted in the southern section of the field and has been targeting a new alluvial deposit designated as the L-Channel deposit.  This deposit was officially recognised and listed as a major resource by the Western Australian government in 2019 and is believed to extend some 19 km in length. Bulk samples from the L-Channel deposit have produced high quality Fancy Yellow diamonds.

Purple Fluorescent Diamonds 
In 2020 IBDH reported that the company had discovered a population of rare diamonds from within the L-Channel that exhibited purple fluorescence under long wave ultraviolet light. While around 35% of all natural diamonds may fluoresce, purple fluorescence in diamonds has only been rarely recorded and never before reported at Ellendale. The causes for this natural phenomenon and the purple colour are still not well understood.

A second company,  publicly listed Burgundy Diamond Mines (ASX: BDM) acquired some already existing leases including the former E9 and E4 mine pits in early 2020 and plans to begin mining of previously abandoned deposits including an alluvial deposit known as Terrace 5 on the western edge of the Ellendale diamond field. The potential for economically re-opening of the former hard rock mines at the E4 and E9 lamprorite pipes and/or associated colluvial deposits is being studied.

References 

Geology of Western Australia
Kimberley (Western Australia)